John of Meda, Ord.Hum., (1100 - 26 September 1159) also known as John of Como, was an Italian monk of the Humiliati Order and abbot at their monasteries at Milan and Como. He has been declared a saint by the Roman Catholic Church.

Life
He was born Giovanni Oldrati (or Oldradi) in the town of Meda, Lombardy. Receiving a vision of the Virgin Mary, in 1134 he felt called to join the Humiliati at their Abbey of Viboldone. This was a religious movement widely viewed with suspicion for heresy, due to their communities being composed of families as well as men and women following the monastic form of life, with the former being the leaders of the community.

John came to work for their adoption of the Benedictine Rule, adapted to their needs. Later John went on to found other monasteries of the Order in the regions of Milan and Lombardy. He spent his later life serving as an abbot, and is known for introducing the Little Office of Our Lady.

Notes 

1100 births
1159 deaths
People from the Province of Monza e Brianza
Humiliati Order
Benedictine abbots
Benedictine saints
Italian Roman Catholic saints
12th-century Christian saints